The World and His Wife is a lost American 1920 silent drama film produced by Cosmopolitan Productions and distributed through Paramount Pictures. Directed by Robert G. Vignola, the film was based on the 1908 Broadway play of the same name by Charles Frederic Nirdlinger, which was adapted from the Spanish language play El Gran Galeoto by Jose Echegaray Y Eizaguirre. The film stars Alma Rubens, Montagu Love, and Pedro de Cordoba and Broadway actress Margaret Dale in her feature film debut.

The story was later filmed at MGM as Lovers (1927).

Cast
Montagu Love as Don Julian
Alma Rubens as Teodora
Gaston Glass as Ernesto
Pedro de Cordoba as Don Severo
Charles K. Gerrard as Don Alvarez
Mrs. Allen Walker as Marie
Byron Russell as Captain Wickersham
Peter Barbierre as Don Julian's Friend (credited as Peter Barbier)
Pierre Gendron as Don Alvarez's Friend (credited as Leon Gendron)
Vincent Macchia as Don Alvarez's Friend
James Savold as Ernesto's Father
Margaret Dale as Mercedes
Ray Allen as Ernesto's Mother

See also
The Celebrated Scandal (1915)
Lovers (1927)

References

External links

 Still images #1, #2, #3
 Period co-advertisement of The World and His Woman and The Leopard Woman
still of Gaston Glass and Alma Rubens(Wisconsin Historical Society)
 newspaper advert The Washington Times August 14, 1920
newspaper advertisement PerthAmboy Evening News November 22, 1920

1920 films
1920 drama films
Silent American drama films
American silent feature films
American black-and-white films
Lost American films
American films based on plays
Films directed by Robert G. Vignola
Paramount Pictures films
Films with screenplays by Frances Marion
1920 lost films
Lost drama films
1920s American films